Prumnopitys standleyi, commonly called Cipresillo,  is a species of conifer in the Yewpine Family (Podocarpaceae). It grows up to 98 feet (30 meters) in height, and is found mostly between 7000 and 10,000 feet ( 2200 to 3100 meters)  altitude. It is found only in Costa Rica. It has foliage similar to that of the Coast Redwood.  The largest known specimen, called the Mother Tree, or Arbol Madre, is 82 feet (25 meters) in height and thirteen feet (four meters) DBH (diameter at breast height).

References

standleyi
Endemic flora of Costa Rica
Data deficient plants
Taxonomy articles created by Polbot